Men's Football at the 2016 South Asian Games was held in Guwahati, India from 6 February – 15 February 2016.

Squads

Fixtures and results
Accurate as of 15 February 2016.

Group A

Group B

Knockout round

Semi finals

Bronze medal match

Gold medal match

Winner

Goalscorers

7 Goals
 Nawayug Shrestha

3 Goals
 Udanta Singh
 Nabib Newaj Jibon

2 Goals
 Ansar Ibrahim
 Mohamed Rifnas
Anjan Bista
 Ahmed Nashid
 Ali Fasir

1 Goal
 Raihan Hasan
 Sohel Rana
 Jigme Dorji
 Pritam Kotal
 Jerry Mawimingthanga
 Jayesh Rane
 Holicharan Narzary
 Ananta Tamang
Prakash Budhathoki
 Bishal Rai
 Muruthala Adnan
 Mohamad Hamza
 Hasan Naiz

Own Goal
  Pritam Kotal (playing against )

Notes and references

See also
 Football at the 2016 South Asian Games – Women's tournament

External links
 Futbol24 - AFC - South Asian Games - Results, fixtures, tables, statistics

2016 South Asian Games
2016 South Asian Games